Sanja Premović (born 27 November 1992) is a Montenegrin handballer for Konyaaltı Belediyesi SK and the Montenegrin national team.

International honours
EHF Champions League:
Semifinalist: 2011

References

External links

1992 births
Living people
People from Berane
Montenegrin female handball players
Expatriate handball players
Montenegrin expatriate sportspeople in Norway
Montenegrin expatriate sportspeople in Poland
Montenegrin expatriate sportspeople in Serbia
Montenegrin expatriate sportspeople in Romania
Mediterranean Games medalists in handball
Mediterranean Games silver medalists for Montenegro
Competitors at the 2018 Mediterranean Games